Apegenine recordings (or Apeg) is a Canadian independent record label. It was established as a Genshi Media subdivision in 2003 by Vincent Fugere and has released music by Montreal's most prominent electronic artist David Kristian, Emanuele Errante, Khonnor, Klaus Lunde (Xerxes), Julien Neto among others.

The music it releases is conceptual inspired by experimental, contemporary and pop music.

New releases include albums by demoscene star and former Beanbag vocalist Hunz, known Renoise user Kaneel and new Portuguese electro acoustic pop group :papercutz.

Selected discography
 Emanuele Errante - Migrations - 2007
 David Kristian - Rhythms for a rainy season - 2005

See also

 List of record labels

References
 Percussionlab Apegenine label showcase
 allrecordlabels
 textura

External links
Official Apegenine website

Record labels established in 2003
Canadian independent record labels
Electronic music record labels
Quebec record labels
Companies based in Montreal